Jonesboro Historic District is a national historic district located at Morganton, Burke County, North Carolina.  It encompasses 35 contributing buildings and 1 contributing site in historically African-American neighborhood of Morganton. The primarily residential buildings were built between about 1895 and 1935. It includes representative examples of Bungalow / American Craftsman and Shotgun style architecture.

It was listed on the National Register of Historic Places in 1987.

References

African-American history of North Carolina
Houses on the National Register of Historic Places in North Carolina
Historic districts on the National Register of Historic Places in North Carolina
Historic districts in Burke County, North Carolina
National Register of Historic Places in Burke County, North Carolina
Houses in Burke County, North Carolina